The 7th constituency of the Nord is a French legislative constituency in the Nord département.

Description

Nord's 7th constituency includes the western portion of Roubaix, the second largest city in Nord-Pas-de-Calais, as well as most of Lannoy which forms its eastern suburbs.

The seat has historically swung between left and right with the Socialist Party in control throughout the 1970s and 1980s. In more recent years, however, the seat has returned the conservative
Francis Vercamer originally for the UMP and New Centre party but now for the UDI and Independents group.

Historic Representation

Election results

2022

 
 
 
 
 
 
 
 
|-
| colspan="8" bgcolor="#E9E9E9"|
|-
 
 

 
 
 
 
 

* LREM dissident

2017

2012

 
 
 
 
|-
| colspan="8" bgcolor="#E9E9E9"|
|-

2007

 
 
 
 
 
 
 
|-
| colspan="8" bgcolor="#E9E9E9"|
|-

2002

 
 
 
 
 
|-
| colspan="8" bgcolor="#E9E9E9"|
|-

1997

 
 
 
 
 
 
|-
| colspan="8" bgcolor="#E9E9E9"|
|-

Sources
 Official results of French elections from 1998: 

7